Anbirkiniyal is a 2021 Indian Tamil-language survival thriller film directed by Gokul and produced by Arun and Alankar Pandian. A remake of the Malayalam film Helen (2019), it stars Arun's daughter Keerthi as a woman who accidentally gets locked in a freezer room and fights to stay alive. The film began production in February 2020, and was released in theatres on 5 March 2021 to positive reviews.

Plot 

Anbirkiniyal Sivam, nicknamed Anbu, is a BSc Nursing graduate and attends IELTS coaching classes intended for a job in Canada. She works part-time at The Chicken Hub, a fried chicken fast food restaurant in a mall to pay off her father Sivam's debts. One night, while Anbu's boyfriend Charles Sebastian is driving her home, they are stopped by police who penalise Charles for drunken driving and not wearing a helmet; both are brought to the police station. Sivam is summoned to the station, and is in dismay of seeing his daughter and does not talk to her despite her several attempts of creating conversation.

One night, Anbu has no one to drop her off home from work. She tries to call Sivam, but he is still angry with her. Her workmates are told by their manager to put some stocks in the freezer room which they ask Anbu to do. When closing for the night, the manager unknowingly locks Anbu in the freezer, where the temperature is -18 °C. Unaware of Anbu's predicament, Charles and Sivam search for her, while Anbu fights to stay alive and not die from freezing. The security guard at the front of the mall tells the police that Anbu did not leave the mall. They start looking for her and eventually find her almost dead in the freezer. Anbu survives, and is hospitalised. Sivam thanks the security guard, who tells Sivam that Anbu was the only one who would smile and wave at him.

Cast 
 Arun Pandian as Sivam
 Keerthi Pandian as Anbirkiniyal Sivam (Anbu)
 Driya as young Anbirkiniyal Sivam
 Praveen Raja as Charles Sebastian
 Gokul as the prisoner
 Boopathy Raja as the manager of The Chicken Hub
 Ravindra Vijay as Ravindran
 Jayaraj Kozhikode as the mall's security guard
 Adinad Sasi as the head constable

Production 
In January 2020, it was reported that Arun Pandian would be remaking the Malayalam film Helen (2019), with his daughter Keerthi starring. The film would be his comeback after a long sabbatical, and Keerthi's second film as actress after Thumbaa (2019). It was directed by Gokul, and co-produced by Arun's other daughter Kavita under A&P Groups. The film is Gokul's fifth as director, and first one not based on an original idea. Mathukutty Xavier, the director of the Malayalam original was offered to direct the remake, but refused since he was unable to "imbibe the changes they needed". Cinematography was handled by Mahesh Muthusamy, and editing by Pradeep E Ragav. Principal photography began in February 2020. The film was near completion as of August 2020. Filming ended by February 2021, and the title Anbirkiniyal was announced on 15 February.

Soundtrack 
The music was composed by Javed Riaz, with lyrics by Lalithanand.

Release 
A press screening for Anbirkiniyal was held on 27 February 2021 at Chennai. The film was released in theatres on 5 March 2021. It was released on Amazon Prime Video on 4 April 2021. The satellite rights were sold to Kalaignar TV.

Reception 
M. Suganth of The Times of India praised Anbirkiniyal for its faithfulness to Helen, noting that director Gokul was "content with ensuring that the emotional beats and the thriller elements of the original are transferred competently. The end result is a film that might not match the intensity of the original, but manages to be a compelling watch, especially for those who might not have watched the original". Sify too praised the remake's faithfulness to the original, but said, "Though the remake falls short of the original in the first half, the thriller portions in the second half work well [...] Technically too, the film has matched the original and all the actors have done their parts well." Navein Darshan of Cinema Express rated the film 3 stars out of 5, saying "The solid supporting cast compensates for the unconvincing lead performances in the beginning. They hold the film together". Ranjani Krishnakumar of Firstpost rated it 3.5 stars out of 5, saying "Despite its shortcomings, Anbirkiniyal is a delightful story of a survivor. One that offers hope that with a little effort, all can be good in the world." Critic Malini Mannath wrote, "For those who have watched the earlier version the reboot may seem a tad underwhelming. But for a first-time viewer it could be a refreshing experience."

References

External links 
 

2020s survival films
2020s Tamil-language films
2021 films
2021 thriller films
Films about father–daughter relationships
Indian survival films
Indian thriller films
Tamil remakes of Malayalam films